Njegoš Goločevac (Serbian Cyrillic: Његош Голочевац; born 21 August 1983) is a Serbian former professional footballer who played as a midfielder.

Career
Goločevac spent six seasons at Sevojno, before transferring to Romanian champions Oțelul Galați in June 2009. He made only three league appearances for the club, before being released. In the summer of 2010, Goločevac joined Sloboda Užice, following the club's merger with Sevojno.

After a short spell with Nordvärmland FF in Sweden, Goločevac returned to his hometown club FAP in July 2014. He was the team's captain in the 2014–15 season, helping them win promotion to the Serbian League West. Eventually, Goločevac left the club during the summer.

Subsequently, Goločevac moved back to Sweden and signed with Västanviks AIF. He scored six league goals from 19 games in the 2016 Div 3 Västra Svealand.

Honours
Sevojno
 Serbian Cup: Runner-up 2008–09

References

External links
 
 
 

Association football midfielders
Expatriate footballers in Bosnia and Herzegovina
Expatriate footballers in Romania
Expatriate footballers in Sweden
ASC Oțelul Galați players
FK FAP players
FK Hajduk Kula players
FK Kolubara players
FK Leotar players
FK Remont Čačak players
FK Sevojno players
FK Sloboda Užice players
Liga I players
People from Priboj
Premier League of Bosnia and Herzegovina players
Serbian expatriate footballers
Serbian expatriate sportspeople in Bosnia and Herzegovina
Serbian expatriate sportspeople in Romania
Serbian expatriate sportspeople in Sweden
Serbian First League players
Serbian footballers
Serbian SuperLiga players
1983 births
Living people